The 2023 World Club Challenge (known as the 2023 Betfred World Club Challenge for sponsorship reasons) was the 29th staging of the World Club Challenge. The match was contested by the NRL winners Penrith Panthers, and Super League champions St Helens.

Background

The challenge was played for the first time since 2020 as the global COVID-19 pandemic led to the cancellation of the intervening fixtures.

Route to final

Penrith Panthers

Penrith defeated Parramatta Eels in the 2022 NRL Grand Final, which qualified them for the 2023 World Club Challenge.

St Helens

St Helens and the Leeds Rhinos competed in the 2022 Super League Grand Final, for a record fifth time at Old Trafford, which saw St Helens win 24–12.

Pre-match

Team selection
Following the departures of Viliame Kikau, Apisai Koroisau, and Charlie Staines to other clubs, Penrith fielded a team with 11 members of their 2022 grand final team. 2022 Clive Churchill Medallist and regular fullback Dylan Edwards missed the match through injury, with Liam Martin and Scott Sorensen also absent through injury concerns.

Officiating
Australian referee Ashley Klein was selected to referee his third World Club Challenge, having previously been in charge of the 2008 and 2012 fixtures.

Match

Summary
The match was originally scheduled to kick off at 18:00 AEDT but due to the extreme heat and humidity forecast for that time, the kick off time was put back to 18:50 AEDT.  The NRL also announced that the game will be played in four quarters of 20 minutes each, with each team allowed an additional interchange player and two extra interchanges allowed during the match.

Saints looked to have won the match with two minutes remaining, but Brian To'o scored a try to bring Penrith to within two points, before Nathan Cleary kicked the conversion, to send the match to extra time.

St Helens eventually won the match 13–12, after a knock on from Penrith, gave Saints possession near the halfway line, before Lewis Dodd kicked the winning drop goal.

Details

Statistics

Penrith Panthers:
 Most runs: 26 – Stephen Crichton
 Most running metres: 214 – Stephen Crichton
 Most line breaks: 1 – Taylan May
 Most tackles: 51 – Zac Hosking
 Most missed tackles: 5 – Mitch Kenny
 Most errors: 3 – Nathan Cleary

St Helens:
 Most runs: 21 –
 Will Hopoate
 Alex Walmsley
 Most running metres: 181 – Alex Walmsley
 Most line breaks: 1 –
 Konrad Hurrell
 Mark Percival
 Curtis Sironen
 Most tackles: 50 – 
 James Roby
 Morgan Knowles
 Most missed tackles: 7 – Morgan Knowles
 Most errors: 3 – Jack Welsby

Post-match

Broadcasting

References

 

 
2023 in Australian rugby league
2023 in English rugby league
World Club Challenge
Penrith Panthers matches
St Helens R.F.C. matches
World Club Challenge
Rugby league in Sydney